Ashaur is a medium size village in Phillaur tehsil of Jalandhar District of Punjab State, India. It is situated on Phillaur Nawanshahr Road and located 3.9 km from Nagar, 10 km from postal head office in Phillaur, 53 km from Jalandhar and 117 km from state capital Chandigarh. The village is administrated by a sarpanch who is an elected representative of village as per Panchayati raj (India).

Caste 
The village has a total population of 1,349 peoples with 274 houses. It has schedule caste (SC) constitutes 32.47% of total population of the village and it doesn't have any Schedule Tribe (ST) population.

Transport

Rail 
Phillaur Junction is the nearest train station however, Bhatian Railway Station is 16 km away from the village.

Air 
The nearest domestic airport is located 41 km away in Ludhiana and the nearest international airport is located in Chandigarh also a second nearest international airport is 148 km away in Amritsar.

References 

Villages in Jalandhar district
Villages in Phillaur tehsil